The 2013–14 season is Panionios Gymnastikos Syllogos Smyrnis' 123rd season in existence and its 53rd in the top tier of the modern Greek football league system. They will also compete in the Greek Cup. It will be their first season in the top division without a match against bitter rivals AEK Athens, but their first in 13 seasons where they will be pitted against rivals from the Smyrna times Apollon Smyrna F.C. Also, this will be the first season without player (for 9,5 years) and captain Fanouris Goundoulakis, who refused to renew his contract.

The club's U-17 and U-20 will compete in their respective leagues.

Players

Current squad

Squad information

Club officials

Coaching staff

Board members

Kit

Transfers

In

Out

Starting 11
<div style="position: relative;">

Matches

Friendlies

Superleague

First round

Second round

Greek Cup
Second Round

Third Round

Quarter-Finals

Top goalscorers
12 goals
 Christos Aravidis (12 in Superleague)
9 goals
 Sakis Theodoropoulos (9 in Superleague)
6 goals
 Dimitris Kolovos (5 in Superleague, 1 in Greek Cup)
4 goals
 Andreas Lasnik (3 in Superleague, 1 in Greek Cup)
 Apostolos Giannou (3 in Superleague, 1 in Greek Cup)
  Markos Dounis (4 in Superleague)
3 goals
 Leonidas Kampantais (2 in Greek Cup, 1 in Superleague)
1 goal
 Vassilis-Konstantinos Lambropoulos (1 in Superleague)
 Kostas Mendrinos (1 in Greek Cup)
 Amiri Kurdi (1 in Greek Cup)

Awards

References

Panionios F.C. seasons
Panionios